Robert Yellin is an American Japanese ceramics specialist who has regularly written for several publications. Yellin currently resides in Japan where he has been living since 1984. He owns and runs Robert Yellin Yakimono Gallery in Kyoto in addition to an informational website and online Japanese ceramic art gallery. Yellin previously wrote the "Ceramic Scene" column for The Japan Times for 10 years. He has written in the past for Daruma Magazine., Asian Arts, Winds Magazine, among others He previously wrote for the quarterly Japanese ceramics magazine Honoho Geijutsu. Yellin wrote "Yakimono Sanka" published by Kogei Shuppan, a book about sake utensils which was later translated into English under the title "Ode to Pottery, Sake Cups and Flasks".

In 2012 Yellin was invited to host a segment on Japanese artisans as part of a TV series created by the Ministry of Foreign Affairs of Japan titled "Japan: Fascinating Diversity." The goal of the series was to help viewers around the globe rediscover the appeal of Japan.

Since 2012, Yellin has been a guest lecturer on specialty Ceramics Tours conducted by Esprit Travel & Tours.  He shares his knowledge and passion for Japanese ceramics through visits to artists' studios and museum throughout Japan.

References

External links
Japanesepottery.com, Online Japanese ceramic gallery
www.e-yakimono.net Information website
Personal blog
http://www.esprittravel.com/escorted-japan-group-tours/japan-ceramics-tour

American art historians
Japanese pottery
Living people
Year of birth missing (living people)